The (Roman Catholic) Diocese of Banmaw is located in the Kachin State in northwestern Myanmar. It is a suffragan diocese of the archdiocese of Mandalay.

The diocese was created on August 26, 2006 by splitting off the southern part of the Diocese of Myitkyina. On November 26 the first bishop Raymond Sumlut Gam was ordained, and the St Patrick church was elevated to the cathedral of the diocese by Archbishop Salvatore Pennacchio, Apostolic Nuncio for Myanmar.

The diocese covers an area of 10,373 km². It is subdivided into 10 parishes. 26,070 of the 450,000 people in the area belong to the Catholic Church.

The diocese covers the districts of Banmaw, Mansi, Momauk and Shwegu, all in Kachin State. Neighboring dioceses are Myitkyina to the north west and to the east, the archdiocese of Mandalay and the diocese of Taunggyi to the south.

External links
Catholic-hierarchy.org
News release on the creation
News release on the ordination 

Banmaw
Christian organizations established in 2006
Roman Catholic dioceses and prelatures established in the 21st century
2006 establishments in Myanmar